The badminton events at the 2010 Commonwealth Games were taking place at Siri Fort Sports Complex and Saket Sports Complex in New Delhi from 4–14 October 2010. The games featured six badminton events – singles and doubles for men and women, mixed doubles and mixed teams.

Badminton medal count

Venues

Competition venue
Siri Fort Sports Complex - 5 match courts and 3 warm-up courts

Training venues        
Siri Fort Sports Complex - 6 courts 
Saket Sports Complex - 3 courts

Medals by events

Participating nations

References
 Official 2010 CWG sport page

2010
 
2010 Commonwealth Games events
Badminton tournaments in India